SBS Eight O'Clock News (Also known as SBS 8 News (SBS 8 뉴스 in Korean)) is the flagship nightly newscast of the Seoul Broadcasting System. Airing from 19:50~21:00 KST on weekdays since 21 September 2020 and from 20:00~20:45 KST on weekends, the newscast is known for breaking the tradition of airing news at 21:00 mastered by KBS with KBS News 9,  MBC with MBC Newsdesk  and JTBC with JTBC Newsroom, which gave the slogan: "News an hour earlier".

It premiered on 9 December 1991, in conjunction with SBS' launch. In commemoration of the broadcaster's 20th anniversary on 9 December 2011, SBS 8 News celebrated its 20th anniversary, making it the longest-running nightly newscast airing on a private broadcaster.

Segments

Current segments 
Since 21 September 2020, most of the segments (except the sports news and weather) has been placed on the second part, nicknamed S-Pick.
 Mobile Coverage - this seems to be a segment similar to MBC Newsdesk's Camera Launch, KBS News 9's Tracing 1234 and JTBC Newsroom's Close Camera where reporters cover stories in-depth based on reports from citizens.
 What is The Truth? - this is a segment where Lee Kyung-won appears in-studio to fact-check statements given by politicians or important events that happened within the country. Towards the end of the segment, they decide if the statement is true through 5 categories: Facts (사실), Almost True (거의 사실), True & False (사실 & 거짓), Almost Untrue (거의 거짓) and Lies (거짓). A mascot named Factkio (팩트키오) also appears during the broadcast.
 Panda to The End - a segment similar to Newsroom's Exploration Plus, it's a recurring segment where Kim Jong-won cover a certain story in-depth. The segment uses a panda as its mascot.
 Healthy Life - a segment where medical reporter Cho Dong-chan analyzes issues related to health.
 Cultural Line - a Friday-only segment where reporters do stories related to entertainment, education and other aspects of culture.
 SBS Sports News - this is a segment where Kim Yoon-sang (on weekdays) and Lee Yoon-ah (on weekends) present sports news. On 30 March 2020, Lee Seung-gi made an appearance towards the end of the segment as a part of their SBS intern special episode of Master in the House. This episode also showed Cha Eun-woo hosting the radio broadcast, while Yang Se-hyung served as Lee's backup in case of unexpected circumstances. Shin Sung-rok and Kim Dong-hyun helped out in the production side.
SBS Weather - the weather segment presented by Nam Yoo-jin on weekdays and Saturdays, and Yang Tae-bin on Sundays.

Former segments 

 Inside the Stock Market - it was a compilation of eight economy-related stories where reporters from the economy and securities team also show the stock market trades through computer graphics.
 Economic Indicators - it is similar with Inside the Stock Market above, only aired on weekdays.
 Today in History - it shows a significant historical event that happened that day.
Issue Report: An In-depth Look/Field Report: Going Without Reservations/We Have a Tip! - established on 23 March 2019, these three segments seem to be similar to Mobile Coverage and Panda to the End.

Anchors
Currently, SBS 8 News is presented by Kim Hyun-woo and Choi Hye-rim on weekdays, and Kim Yong-tae and Joo Si-eun on weekends. Lee Yoon-ah presents the sports news on weekdays and weekends.. Nam Yoo-jin presents the weather forecast on weekdays and Saturdays, while Yang Tae-bin does it on Sundays.

Main presenters

Broadcast times

Local versions
Local newscasts are aired after SBS 8 NEWS at 20:35 on weekdays. A typical newscast runs for 20 minutes on weekdays and 10 minutes on weekends. The local newscasts pre-empt the SBS 8 NEWS Sports news and Business news segment.

See also 

 KBS News 9
 MBC Newsdesk
 JTBC Newsroom

External links

South Korean television news shows
Korean-language television shows
Flagship evening news shows